The Fabulous Dorseys is a 1947 musical biopic which tells the story of the brothers Tommy and Jimmy Dorsey, from their boyhood in Shenandoah, Pennsylvania through their rise, their breakup, and their personal reunion. The film was also released under the alternate title The Fighting Dorseys.

Background

The film is a musical comedy based on the lives and careers of Tommy and Jimmy Dorsey. The Dorsey Brothers star as themselves. Other actors include Janet Blair, William Lundigan, Sara Allgood and Arthur Shields. Janet Blair demonstrates that she is a highly competent singer.

The "side plot" focuses on a romance between Jane, who grew up with the Dorseys and becomes the singer with their band, and Bob Burton, who leaves his employment as a support pianist for the cinema and joins the Dorseys. Bob writes music and strives to complete an original American-sound concerto.

There are also cameo appearances by other jazz musicians of the period: Paul Whiteman, Charlie Barnet, Henry Busse, Bob Eberly, Helen O'Connell and Art Tatum. Pianist Tatum "is shown playing in a night club with the piano surrounded by the Dorsey brothers and other  well-known musicians, who finally join him in an ensemble blues."

The Jimmy Dorsey composition and theme song "Contrasts" is played in the movie. "Green Eyes", "Tangerine", "I'll Never Smile Again", "Marie", and "I'm Getting Sentimental Over You" are also featured in the movie, along with "To Me" and "Dorsey Concerto". Paul Whiteman and the Orchestra perform "At Sundown". Art Tatum performs "Turquoise" and "Art's Blues" at the piano.

The film was written by Art Arthur, Richard English and Curtis Kenyon. It was directed by Alfred E. Green.

Cast

 Tommy Dorsey as himself (Jimmy's Brother)
 Jimmy Dorsey as himself (Tommy's Brother)
 Janet Blair as Jane Howard
 Paul Whiteman as himself
 William Lundigan as Robert Burton (Bob)
 Sara Allgood as Mrs. Dorsey
 Arthur Shields as Tommy Dorsey Sr.
 Dave Willock as Foggy
 William Bakewell as Eddie
 James Flavin as Gorman
 Charlie Barnet as himself
 Bob Eberly as Band Vocalist
 Henry Busse as Bandleader
 Helen O'Connell as Band Vocalist
 Mike Pingitore as Musician
 Art Tatum as himself

References

External links
 
 
 
 

1947 films
1940s biographical films
1940s romantic musical films
American biographical films
American romantic musical films
Biographical films about musicians
American black-and-white films
Films directed by Alfred E. Green
United Artists films
Cultural depictions of jazz musicians
1940s English-language films
1940s American films